Rems Nnanyelugo Umeasiegbu (born 1 October 1943), is Nigerian professor, scholar, novelist, poet and  folklorist from south-eastern Nigeria. . He was also a Principal Lecturer at the Institute of Management Technology, Enugu (1978-1982), and Head of Department, Mass Communications, IMT, Nigeria (1982-1986) and professor of oral literature at Nnamdi  Azikiwe University, Awka as well as a  consultant to Koruna Books Publications.

Early life and marriage
Umeasiegbu was born in Aba, though a native of Amesi in Aguata Local Government of Anambra State. One Ugandan reviewer has this to say about Rems' background:

His father, G. U. Umeasiegbu, was (or is, I can't tell), a leading elder in the county of Aba, and he customarily entertained such dignitaries as the councillors  of the Aba Urban Council. One day when the councillors gathered in his homestead, he asked his son, Rems Nna Umeasiegbu, to bring in palmwine for the guests, The son served the palmwine without taking a sip first, a  violation of Ibo custom. The father threatened to remove him from school, which, the father felt, was corrupting his knowledge of the Ibo traditions. The serious sermon following the reprimand left such an imprint on Umeasiegbu's mind that he later decided to reconstruct the Ibo customs as he recollected them while studying at Oxfordshire in Britain. Thus his only informant in retrospect was his father, and his only methodology, corruption of his father's sermons and tale-telling sessions. 

In 1976, at the request of the Nigerian government, Rems returned to Nigeria. He married a school teacher Virginia Okediogwu Anakwenze on 16 October 1976 and they have four children. Back in Nigeria, he worked at the Federal Ministry of Information, Lagos as an information officer with responsibilities for organising the festival of black arts and culture, FESTAC '77.

Education
Professor Rems attended CKS, Aba, before studying at College of Immaculate Conception, Enugu. In 1966, he proceeded to England for further studies. He later studied in Oxfordshire, England. After spending a year in England, he got a scholarship to study for his Master of Arts at the University of Sedmnact, Listopadu, Prague, Czech Republic in 1971 and another MA at the University of Pennsylvania in 1972. He then later bagged a doctorate degree in Oral Literature from the University of Pennsylvania, the US, in 1975.   He moved to the Grambling State University, Louisiana, where he was an assistant professor.

Notable publications
While in Prague, he wrote his first major work The Way We lived (1969) at the age of 26. The seminal work is a chronicle of folk tales from pre-colonial Nigeria. At Louisiana he wrote the work of fiction Mazi Amesi, a fictional account of an African slave. For his artistic output, he was honoured with Distinguished Writers' Award in 1987.

Career
Rems left Lagos for a teaching appointment at the University of Nigeria, Nsukka, where he was a colleague of the renowned writer the late Professor Chinua Achebe. He left the University of Nigeria in 1978, for the Institute of Management Technology, Enugu, where he rose to be the deputy head of the institution. Upon the creation of Anambra State, Umeasiegbu joined the newly formed Nnamdi Azikiwe University, Awka, as one of the pioneer staff of the Department of English Language and Literature. He was made a professor of oral literature in 2001.  He retired in 2008. He has served as a visiting professor at the Department of English Language and Literature, Ebonyi State University, Abakaliki, since 2014.

References

External links 
 Rems Umeasiegbu at Google Books
 Umeasiegbu,  R.  N. Ghost  Stories.Enugu:  Koruna  Book, 2006. 
 Umeasiegbu, N. R (1982). Words are Sweet: Igbo Stories and Storytelling. Netherlands: Leiden. .

1943 births
Living people
20th-century Nigerian novelists
Igbo novelists
Nigerian male short story writers
Nigerian short story writers
Academic staff of the University of Nigeria
People from Aba, Abia
University of Pennsylvania alumni
Grambling State University faculty
Nigerian male novelists